Desmopuntius is a genus of small freshwater cyprinids native to Southeast Asia. They were formerly included in Puntius.

Etymology 
The name Desmopuntius is derived from the Greek language δεσμψτης ("desmotes") meaning 'prisoner' and genus name "Puntius", a reference to the striped outfits commonly attributed to prison wear.

Species
According to FishBase, there are currently seven recognized species in this genus. Another species recognized as Systomus endecanalis by FishBase is placed in the genus Desmopuntius by Catalog of Fishes, following a taxonomic review by Maurice Kottelat in 2013.

 Desmopuntius foerschi (Kottelat, 1982)
 Desmopuntius gemellus (Kottelat, 1996)
 Desmopuntius hexazona (M. C. W. Weber & de Beaufort, 1912) (Six-banded tiger barb)
 Desmopuntius johorensis (Duncker, 1904) (Striped barb)
 Desmopuntius pentazona (Boulenger, 1894) (Fiveband barb)
 Desmopuntius rhomboocellatus (Koumans, 1940) (Snakeskin barb)
 Desmopuntius trifasciatus (Kottelat, 1996)

References

 
Taxa named by Maurice Kottelat